Bala Loca (originally Entero Quebrado) is a Chilean television series created by Marcos de Aguirre and David Miranda and produced by Filmosonido for Chilevisión. Bala loca means "stray bullet".

The series revolves around an investigation by a disabled journalist, Mauro Murillo (Alejandro Goic), and features a cast with both established actors including Alfredo Castro, Aline Kuppenheim, Julio Milostich, Catalina Saavedra, Pablo Schwarz, Ingrid Isensee, as well as younger actors such as Fernanda Urrejola, Mario Horton and Lucas Bolvarán.

The production was the recipient of the annual grant from Chile's National Television Council in 2014. It premiered on television on July 4, 2016.  The first season ended on September 4, 2016, with a double episode.

Plot 

The main protagonist is Mauro Murillo (Alejandro Goic). After fighting the military dictatorship of Augusto Pinochet, he became a celebrity journalist, a fact which some of his colleagues still do not forgive. At the peak of his career, he suffered a car accident that left him in a wheelchair. The rejection of his latest project by a television executive is causing him to reflect on his career. In addition to his career problems, Mauro also deals with his separation from Ángela (Aline Kuppenheim), a journalist who works at a newspaper; an abandoned teenage son, Daniel (Víctor Quezada), who begins to struggle with changes as a teenager; and a sexually dissatisfied girlfriend, Valeria Sánchez (Fernanda Urrejola), a younger woman who has a communications consulting company.

At fifty years old, the only possibility he sees of changing his situation is to invest the profits from his past ten years of stardom doing celebrity journalism, and to establish an online journalism site that fearlessly confronts the powerful of Chile. He clings to the possibility of working with Patricia Fuenzalida (Catalina Saavedra), a widely respected professional journalist who writes an independent blog, a platform she uses to unmask corrupt entrepreneurs. However, she rejects him again and again, disenchanted with his lack of professional ethics. In the midst of his desperate attempts to change her mind, she dies in a strange assault on a supermarket.

Mauro's instinct tells him that something else is hiding behind the supposed stray bullet (bala loca) that ended the journalist's life. Thus, he turns to Oscar (Mateo Iribarren), Patricia's husband, to help him discover what the journalist was investigating. Finally it is Víctor (Nicolás Durán), her son, who gives him the folders holding the murdered journalist's investigation. Thus, Eugenio 'Coco' Aldunate (Alfredo Castro), a powerful businessman who owns a health insurance company, becomes the main suspect. The magnate maintains political ties with Julián Torres Becker (Marcial Tagle), a liberal and progressive senator from the PPD who is a close friend of Murillo. Aldunate is also the main suspect of Nelson Iturra (Pablo Schwarz), a police investigator who takes the case of the reporter's death.

Mauro assembles a new team: Gabriela Vuskovic (Trinidad González), an experienced journalist and a demanding leader; Antonia Serrano (Ingrid Isensee), a journalist who worked at the newspaper with Murillo's ex-wife, but left her comfortable job to do more challenging journalism; Andrés Villanueva (Mario Horton), a journalist with technology skills, highly committed to justice and truth; and Alejandra Mujica (Manuela Oyarzún), a young professional with a reporter's nose, whose tenacity makes her a daring investigator. Mauro announces the premise on which their new EnGuardia.cl website is founded: Is it possible that in today's Chile a journalist is killed for investigating the powerful?

Production 

In 2014, the series produced by Filmosonido was awarded the grant of the National Television Council of Chile, 
worth CLP$437,914,700 (US in 2014), for its production. Recording occurred from January 11 to April 23, 2016.

Cast

Main 

 Alejandro Goic as Mauro Murillo
 Trinidad González as Gabriela Vuskovic
 Ingrid Isensee as Antonia Serrano
 Mario Horton as Andrés Villanueva
 Manuela Oyarzún as Alejandra Mujica
 Fernanda Urrejola as Valeria Sánchez
 Catalina Saavedra as Patricia Fuenzalida
 Pablo Schwarz as Nelson Iturra
 Aline Kuppenheim as Ángela Schmidt
 Marcial Tagle as Julián Torres Becker
 Víctor Quezada as Daniel Murillo
 Alfredo Castro as Eugenio "Coco" Aldunate
 Roberto Farías as Alexis Vilches

Recurring 

 Nicolás Durán as Víctor Paredes Fuenzalida
 Mateo Iribarren as Óscar Paredes
 Julio Milostich as General Larrondo
 Willy Semler as General Arismendi
 Hugo Medina as Julio Osorio
 Erto Pantoja as Oliverio Farías
 Iván Álvarez de Araya as Agustín
 María Paz Grandjean as Mariana Lobos
 Víctor Montero as Félix Morales
 Sebastián Ayala as Technician
 Luis Uribe as Rapist
 Daniel Candia as Mario Palazzo, Hitman
 Simón Pascal as Assailant
 Francisco Ossa as Daniel's School Inspector
 Gaspar Rosson as Felipe
 Benjamín Westfall as Supermarket Guard
 Mario Ossandón as Aldunate's Lawyer
 Lucas Bolvarán as Rodrigo
 Rodrigo Soto as Uncle Carlos
 Alex Draper as Peter
 Román Wilson as Dylan
 Thomas Bentin as Mikael Ivelic
 Christián Farías as Secuaz

Guests 

 Pablo Cerda as Fabio
 Alejandro Sieveking as Pedro Cisneros
 Michael Silva as Joel Medina
 Boris Quercia as César Fantini
 Celine Reymond as Juliana
 Sergio Hernández as Mr. Murillo
 Eyal Meyer as Man X
 Pablo Striano as Pelao Fernández
 Ximena Rivas as Luisa Arismendi
 Andrea Martínez as Commentator
 Javiera Torres as Victoria "Vicky"
 Jack Arama as Doctor Materán
 Daniela Torres as Reporter
 Laura Olazábal as Shooting Club Secretary
 Rodrigo Lisboa as Forensic Technician
 Elvis Fuentes as Ramírez
 Silvana Hardy as Marta
 Vittorio Yaconi as Pablo Miller
 Andrés Rillón as YouTube Journalist
 Eugenio González as TV Politician
 Eduardo Squella as TV Politician
 Ignacio Santa Cruz as Ricardo Rojas
 Manuel Peña as Hugo Céspedes
 Eduardo de Aguirre as Juez Rómulo
 Carlos Isensee as Judge Radic
 Eugenio Ahumada as Judge
 Gabriela Calvete as Sound Technician
 Rafael de la Reguera as Cameraman
 Nikolás Bottinelli as Dealer
 Cristián Quezada as Tito Almeyda
 Iván Parra as Mateo
 Renato Illanes as Juan Molina
 Katy Cabezas as Lorena Pérez
 Carlos Donoso as Guard
 David Miranda as Prosecutor Awad
 Edinson Díaz as Taxi Driver
 Pesquinel Martínez as Executive
 Diego Thompson as Government Person
 Marcial Edwards as Congressional Officer
 Antonia Krug as Casandra
 Renata Goiri as Martina
 Joseff Messmer as Manuel

Cameos 

 Sergio Campos
 Francisca García-Huidobro
 Felipe Vidal
 Carolina de Moras
 Claudia Schmidt
 Kika Silva
 Paulina Rojas
 Botota Fox
 Macarena Pizarro
 Karina Alvárez
 Karim Butte

Awards and nominations

References

External links 

 Official site of Bala Loca
 Complete series  in the video library of the National Television Council.

2016 in Chilean television
Chilevisión original programming